Jorge Alberto Berendt (born 19 July 1964) is an Argentine professional golfer. 

Born in Formosa, Argentina, Berendt worked as a caddie before turning professional in 1982. He competed in the British Open in 1990. He played on the European Tour and Challenge Tour from 1990 to 2004, winning one tournament, the Cannes Open in 2001. He was second in the 1993 Portuguese Open, the 2002 Hong Kong Open, the 1991 Les Bulles Laurent-Perrier, and the 1999 Argentine PGA Championship. He now works as commentator for The Golf Channel in Latin America

Professional wins (19)

European Tour wins (1)

European Tour playoff record (0–1)

Challenge Tour wins (2)

Argentina wins (13)
1984 Golfer's Grand Prix
1988 Acantilados Grand Prix
1989 Norpatagonico Open, Abierto del Litoral
1991 San Isidro International Open, Abierto del Litoral
1993 Center Open
1996 North Open
1997 South Open
1999 Hindu Club Grand Prix
2001 Carilo Grand Prix
2005 Carilo Grand Prix
2006 SHA Grand Prix

Other wins (3)
1997 Viña del Mar Open (Chile), Beirut Open (Lebanon)
2008 La Posada de la Concepcion Grand Prix (Chile)

Team appearances
World Cup (representing Argentina): 1996, 1997

External links

Argentine male golfers
European Tour golfers
European Senior Tour golfers
People from Formosa, Argentina
Sportspeople from Buenos Aires
1964 births
Living people